Soetpatats, also known as soet karamel patats (translated into English as a "caramelised sweet potatoes"), is a sweet potato dish often baked in a dutch oven with butter, brown sugar, cinnamon, and in some recipes lemon juice. It is an Afrikaans dish and originates from South Africa. It is commonly served as a side dish at braais (barbecues), often served alongside snoek (Thyrsites). The dish was one of many Afrikaner foods recorded by Afrikaans poet C. Louis Leipoldt, and was noted by him as being one of his favourites.

See also
 List of sweet potato dishes

References 

South African cuisine
Sweet potatoes